Gavialiceps taiwanensis is an eel in the family Muraenesocidae (pike congers). It was described by Johnson T. F. Chen and Herman Ting-Chen Weng in 1967, originally under the genus Chlopsis. It is a marine, deep water-dwelling eel which is known from the northwestern Pacific Ocean, including Taiwan (from which its species epithet is derived) and Okinawa, Japan.

References

Muraenesocidae
Fish described in 1967